Madan Bahadur Amatya  is a member of 2nd Nepalese Constituent Assembly. He won Lalitpur–3 seat in 2013 Nepalese Constituent Assembly election from Nepali Congress.

References

Year of birth missing (living people)
Nepali Congress politicians from Bagmati Province
Living people
Members of the 2nd Nepalese Constituent Assembly